The New Adventures of Superman is a half-hour series of six-minute animated Superman adventures produced by Filmation that were broadcast Saturday mornings on CBS from September 10, 1966, to September 5, 1970. The 68 segments appeared as part of three different programs during that time, packaged with similar shorts featuring The Adventures of Superboy and other DC Comics superheroes.

History
These adventures were the first time that Superman (and his guise of Clark Kent), Lois Lane and Perry White had been seen in animated form since the Fleischer brothers had immortalized them in the Superman short films of the 1940s.

The first TV series produced by Filmation Associates, The New Adventures of Superman was extremely popular in its Saturday morning time slot and employed the services of several DC Comics writers including George Kashdan, Leo Dorfman and Bob Haney. Many of the character designs (later based upon the artwork of Superman artist Curt Swan in the show's third season) stayed true to their comic book counterparts; iconic shirt-rip shots and related transformations from Clark Kent into Superman were incorporated into almost every episode, and such lines as "Up, up, and away!" and "This is a job for Superman!" were also borrowed from both the comics and the original Superman radio series. In addition, this series marked the animation debuts of Jimmy Olsen and classic Superman villains such as Lex Luthor, Brainiac, the Toyman, the Prankster, Titano, and Mister Mxyzptlk, as well as the inclusion of new villains like the Warlock and the Sorcerer. Due to a limited production budget, stock animation was often re-used for certain shots of Superman flying (or switching identities from Clark Kent into the Man of Steel), while character movement was often kept at a minimum; this would later become a trademark of Filmation's animated productions.

Producer Lou Scheimer also recruited Clayton "Bud" Collyer and Joan Alexander, veterans of the Superman radio show and the Max Fleischer Superman cartoons, for the voices of Clark Kent/Superman and Lois Lane respectively. Jackson Beck, who had narrated, and provided the character voice of Perry White on, the radio show, reprised those same roles for the cartoon version, while Jack Grimes, who had played Jimmy Olsen in its later years, took that part here as well. For this series, Collyer returned to the same vocal technique he had perfected on the radio show to play the Man Of Steel. While in the identity of Clark Kent, Collyer would keep his voice lighter while projecting a sense of weakness. But whenever the mild-mannered reporter would change into his true identity of Superman, Collyer's voice would deepen dramatically into a heroic baritone. Alexander departed after the first season and was replaced by Julie Bennett in later seasons. The theme music for the show was composed by John Marion Gart. Mort Weisinger, editor of the Superman comics, acted as story consultant for the animated series, and made sure to include characters from his era, like Titano and Brainiac.

Despite its success, the series sparked the anger of Action for Children's Television, a grassroots organization formed in 1968 and dedicated to improving the quality of television programming offered to children, due to Superman throwing punches and other action-related violence which the group found objectionable. As a result, the series was soon cancelled, and future cartoons would not allow for such comic book violence.
 
Superman subsequently appeared in ABC's long-running animated series Super Friends (1973), produced by Hanna-Barbera, whose rights to DC Comics characters were gradually transferred from Filmation.

Episode list

Season 1 (1966–67)
The series premiered on September 10, 1966 as a "30-minute" program titled The New Adventures of Superman, featuring two Superman segments with one The Adventures of Superboy short in between.

Thirty-six Superman segments were produced that season:

Episodes marked with an asterisk (*) denote episodes in which Julie Bennett voices Lois Lane.

Season 2: The Superman/Aquaman Hour of Adventure (1967–68)
The Superman/Aquaman Hour of Adventure was first broadcast on September 9, 1967. This 60-minute program included new Superman segments, and adventures featuring Aquaman and his sidekick Aqualad. It also comprised a rotating series of cartoons featuring the Flash and Kid Flash, Green Lantern, Hawkman, the Atom, the Justice League of America, and the Teen Titans (Speedy, Kid Flash, Wonder Girl and Aqualad), and new Superboy shorts.

Sixteen Superman segments were produced that season:

Julie Bennett voices Lois Lane in three episodes - "The Prankster", "The Saboteurs" and "War of the Bee Battalion".

Season 3: The Batman/Superman Hour (1968–69)
The Batman/Superman Hour premiered on September 14, 1968, featuring new two-part Superman segments alongside new Superboy shorts and the adventures of Batman, Robin and Batgirl.

Sixteen Superman segments were produced that season:

Season 4 (1969–70)
The New Adventures of Superman returned for one last time on CBS, beginning September 13, 1969. The format was the same as before—a "30-minute" program with two Superman segments and one Superboy segment. All episodes were reruns of those that had previously aired.

Cast
 Bud Collyer as Kal-El / Clark Kent / Superman (Superman segments)
 Bob Hastings as Young Kal-El / Clark Kent / Superboy (Superboy segments)
 Jackson Beck as Narrator (Superman segments), Perry White (Superman segments), Beany Martin (Superman segments)
 Ted Knight as Narrator (Superboy segments)
 Joan Alexander as Lois Lane (Superman segments, 1966-1967 & 1969-1970)
 Ray Owens as Warlock (Superman segments), Lex Luthor (Superman segments)
 Jack Grimes as Jimmy Olsen (Superman segments)
 Julie Bennett as Lois Lane (Superman segments, 1967-1969)
 Gilbert Mack as Mr. Mxyzptlk (Superman segments), Brainiac (Superman segments)
 Janet Waldo as Lana Lang (Superboy segments)

Production crew
 Directed by Hal Sutherland
 Produced by Lou Scheimer and Norm Prescott
 Scripts by George Kashdan
 Based on Characters Created by Jerome Siegel and Joe Shuster
 Story Consultant: Mort Weisinger
 Storyboard Artists: Harvey Toombs, Bob Maxfield
 Layouts: Don Christensen, C.L. Hartman, Wes Herschensohn, Ken Hultgren, Raymond Jacobs, Dan Noonan
 Backgrounds: Erv Kaplan, Ted Littlefield, Lorraine Marue, Takashi Masunaga, Paul Xander
 Animators: Bill Hajee, Clarke Mallory, Jack Ozark, Virgil Raddatz, Morey Reden, Len Rogers, Don Schloat, Xenia DeMattia, Lou Zukor
 Animation Checking: Renee Henning, Ann Oliphant, Jane Philippi
 Ink and Paint Manager: Martha Buckley
 Camera: Gene Gropper
 Film Editor: Joseph Simon
 Sound Supervisor: Jim Bullock
 Music Composed and Conducted by John Gart
 Music Supervised by Gordon Zahler
 Assistant Director: Anatole Kirsanoff
 Production Coordinator: Joe Lynch
 Production Assistant: Jack Boasberg
 Executive Producer: Allen Ducovny
 Superman Comics are published monthly by DC Comics
 A Filmation Associates Production In Association With Ducovny, Inc.
 Copyright(c) Filmation Associates, Inc., 1966-1970.

Home media
In 1985, Warner Home Video released seven selected episodes of the series on VHS in the "Super Powers" video collection along with Aquaman, Batman, and Superboy. These videos were re-released in 1996.

On June 26, 2007, Warner Bros. Home Video (via DC Comics Entertainment and Warner Bros. Family Entertainment) released a two-disc DVD box set of The New Adventures of Superman featuring all 36 original, uncut episodes from the first season, and was presented in its original airdate order. However, the 1960s cartoon shorts of The Adventures of Superboy were omitted from the release, due to a battle between Warner Bros. Entertainment and the estate of Jerry Siegel over the rights to the Superboy name that occurred during the time.

On June 3, 2014, Warner Bros. Home Entertainment released seasons 2 & 3 on DVD in Region 1.  The 2-disc set features the remaining 32 episodes of the series.

References

External links
 .
 Superman Homepage - The New Adventures of Superman
 The New Adventures of Superman at the Big Cartoon DataBase

1966 American television series debuts
1970 American television series endings
1960s American animated television series
1970s American animated television series
CBS original programming
American children's animated action television series
American children's animated adventure television series
American children's animated science fiction television series
American children's animated superhero television series
Animated Superman television series
Superman television series by Filmation
Television series by Warner Bros. Television Studios
English-language television shows
Animated television shows based on DC Comics
Television shows directed by Hal Sutherland